In the years running up to the 2022 Italian general election, held on 25 September, various organisations carried out opinion polls to gauge voting intention in Italy. Results of such polls are given in this article. The date range is from after the 2018 Italian general election, held on 4 March, to 9 September 2022. Poll results are reported at the dates when the fieldwork was done, as opposed to the date of publication; if such date is unknown, the date of publication is given instead. Under the Italian par condicio (equal conditions) law, publication of opinion polls is forbidden in the last two weeks of an electoral campaign.

Polling aggregation 
Polling aggregations are performed by taking weighted or unweighted averages of election polls. They are all from 2022.
 Party vote

 Coalition vote

 Seat projections (Chamber of Deputies)

 Seat projections (Senate of the Republic)

Party vote 
Parties or lists are ordered according to their share of the vote in 2018. Power to the People and Us with Italy remain active but have been rarely polled after 2019. New parties and lists like Green Europe, We Are Europeans/Action, Cambiamo!, Italia Viva, Italexit, Coraggio Italia, and Together for the Future/Civic Commitment are ordered by foundation date. From May–December 2021, Coraggio Italia replaced Cambiamo! From January–August 2022, most pollers listed together Action and More Europe by their own request.

Starting from the beginning of 2019, some agencies polled Free and Equal (LeU), others The Left (LS), and some others both. The two lists, LeU for the 2018 Italian general election and LS for the 2019 European Parliament election in Italy, have slightly different but partially overlapping compositions: the former included Article One (Art.1), the latter had the Communist Refoundation Party, which was part of Power to the People in 2018, and both included Italian Left (SI). Since May 2021, most pollsters started to give data separately for Art.1 and SI. Starting in late April 2022, Art.1 was sometimes included within the Democratic Party's polling numbers. By August 2022, Art.1 joined the Democratic Party – Democratic and Progressive Italy alliance, while SI formed the Greens and Left Alliance list with Green Europe; both lists are part of the centre-left coalition.

Graphical summary

2022

2021

2020

2019

2018

Coalition vote

2022

Seat projections

Chamber of Deputies 
 400 seats are available; 201 seats are needed for a majority.
 In some polls, only the 392 constituencies in Italy proper are allocated, while the 8 abroad constituencies are omitted.

Senate of the Republic 
 200 seats are available, plus 6 senators for life; 104 seats are needed for a majority.
 In some polls, only the 196 constituencies in Italy proper are allocated, while the 4 abroad constituencies are omitted.

Subnational polls

Abruzzo

Abruzzo 01

Apulia

Calabria

Calabria 01

Campania

Senate of the Republic

Campania 04: Naples

Lombardy

Senate of the Republic

Lombardy 03: Milan

Liguria

Tuscany

Chamber of the Deputies

Tuscany 06: Prato

Veneto

See also 
 Opinion polling for the 2019 European Parliament election in Italy

Notes

References

External links 
 
 

2022 elections in Italy
Italy
Opinion polling in Italy